Bradley Grant Kent (June 22, 1958-February 3, 2016) was a Canadian musician who played guitar with many of the early Vancouver punk rock bands, particularly Victorian Pork, the band which spawned D.O.A., Pointed Sticks and the Subhumans. Later he went to San Francisco to play guitar for the Avengers with Penelope Houston.

In 1977, Kent was a member of Vancouver punk band, The Skulls, which also featured singer Joey Shithead, bassist Wimpy Roy, drummer Dimwit, and guitarist Simon Werner. The Skulls moved to Toronto, with eventual plans to relocate to London, England, but Kent stayed behind and formed Victorian Pork, which became a proving ground for several future Vancouver punk scene stalwarts, including Ian Tiles, Tony Bardach, Gerry Useless, Randy Rampage and Chuck Biscuits. When the Skulls broke up and hobbled back to Vancouver, Joey Shithead formed DOA with Victorian Pork drummer Chuck Biscuits (Dimwit's younger brother) and former Victorian Pork drummer, Randy Rampage, who moved to bass. Meanwhile, Dimwit and Wimpy formed the Subhumans with Brad Kent on guitar (this original version was a trio, Wimpy played bass and sang). Later, the more recognized line-up was formed with former Victorian Pork bassist Gerry Hannah AKA Gerry Useless and guitarist Mike Graham AKA Mike Normal. Mike and Gerry were in the Stiffs with Zippy Pinhead & Sid Sick.

When the Stiffs broke up Zippy & Sid formed Rabid. A little while later, Brad Kent would join DOA, expanding them to a four-piece, right after the release of DOA's Disco Sucks EP. You can see this Brad Kent version of DOA on the DOA DVD compilation Greatest Shits, which shows DOA & Kent blazing through a version of Disco Sucks on the back of a flatbed truck in Stanley Park at an anarchist/punk "festival" in 1978. This is the version of DOA that toured down to San Francisco's Mabuhay Gardens on 2 separate trips, impressing the scene down there and making lifelong fans out of the Dils, Dead Kennedys and the Avengers. After getting kicked out of DOA, Brad Kent formed the Wasted Lives, with singer Phil Smith, guitarist Colin Griffiths, drummer Andy Graffiti, and future Modernettes bassist Mary Armstrong. He then got the invitation to join The Avengers and moved down to San Francisco. Then the Avengers broke up, and he formed the 45s with Controllers drummer Carla du Plantier AKA Mad Dog, singer Heather Haley of the Zellots, and Randy Rampage who was on hiatus from D.O.A. But Rampage rejoined D.O.A., and Kent entered a period of relative inactivity. Around 1982 when Rampage left D.O.A. again, the two of them collaborated on Randy Rampage's solo 12-inch EP. All through this period Kent & Rampage gigged as The Sick Ones, with various guest vocalists. Around about 1986 they got more serious and embraced their heavy metal inner selves, forming Ground Zero. Randy left shortly afterwards to play bass for Iron Gypsy, one of the new buzz bands on the scene, with vocalist/guitarist James Mark (AKA "Wickley"), and Death Sentence drummer Doug "Donut" Prouxl, while Brad continued on with Ground Zero. Randy later went on to sing briefly for Annihilator, while Brad joined Death Sentence after their first EP came out, but did not appear on it.
During the late 1990s, Brad Kent reformed Victorian Pork in Vancouver for a brief time.  He rejoined with Wasted Lives, Modernettes Bassist Mary Jo Kopechne aka Mary Armstrong, Mary Celeste, Mary Cherry, to form the band Monster Baby in Edmonton Alberta.  He contracted H1N1 During this time as he did not believe in the flu shots and Mary brought it home from work after an outbreak at her place of employment with Alberta Health Services. He died at the University of Alberta Hospital intensive care unit after a fight with H1N1 for a term of life support for 10 days.  H1N1 filled his lungs with fluid, elevated his liver enzymes, compromised his kidneys and put him on dialysis, and finally killed his stomach so he could no longer consume nutrition.  It was decided by the college that his stomach was not able to be reconstituted and his 10 day event on life support was ended on February 3, 2016.  Bradley Grant Kent was taken off life support and succumbed to the H1N1 virus after 45 seconds of the life support system being removed.  He died with Mary Armstrong, his daughter and sister by his side.

References

Canadian punk rock guitarists
2016 deaths
Avengers (band) members
The Skulls (Canadian band) members
1958 births